National Museum of Modern Art may refer to:

 Musée National d'Art Moderne
 National Museum of Modern Art, Kyoto
 National Museum of Modern Art, Tokyo